Maureen Ihua is a Nollywood actress who acted in movies such as Domitila, Unplanned and Unpredictable. She acted alongside Liz Benson and Regina Askia.

Early life and education 
Ihua is from Rivers State and attended Mariam Girls Secondary School.

Career 
She has featured in about 100 movies in the Nollywood industry.

Filmography 
 Domitila
 The millions
 Unpredictable
 Unplanned
 The Game
 Mama's big stick
 Spirit of love
 Masked
 Legend at 60

Personal life 
Ihua is married and has five children.

References

External links 
 

20th-century Nigerian actresses
Nigerian film actresses
21st-century Nigerian actresses
Actresses from Rivers State
People from Rivers State
Year of birth missing (living people)
Living people